"Indescribably Blue" is a song written by Darrell Glenn and recorded by Elvis Presley on June 10, 1966. It was released by RCA Records as a single on January 10, 1967, backed with "Fools Fall in Love". The song peaked at No. 33 on the Billboard Hot 100 singles chart on February 24, 1967.

Jerry Schilling, a member of Presley's entourage, described "Indescribably Blue" as "an intense, emotional, vocally demanding ballad." Biographer Peter Guralnick described the song as "a pretty, somewhat insipid ballad."

Charts

References

1967 songs
Elvis Presley songs
RCA Records singles
1960s ballads